Ivyspring International Publisher is a publisher of scientific literature including open-access scientific journals, such as the International Journal of Medical Sciences and International Journal of Biological Sciences.

External links
 

Book publishing companies of Australia
Academic publishing companies